The Organization of Serbian Students Abroad (OSSA; Serbian: Организација српских студената у иностранству; ОССИ) is an international, non-profit, non-governmental and apolitical organization founded by Serbian students in 1997. Since its founding, OSSA has helped Serbian students study abroad and assisted them in their return to Serbia via various national and international projects, with the goal of supporting and strengthening the community of Serbian students in the diaspora.

Headquartered in Belgrade, OSSA has 22 country-level branches in Europe, North America, Asia and Australia with thousands of members. In addition to Belgrade, the Organization of Serbian Students Abroad has offices in three other cities: Novi Sad, Niš and Banja Luka in Bosnia and Herzegovina. As an international organization, OSSA's projects and events are done at both national and international levels. Currently, the organization has a total of 10,000 members.

History
OSSA was formed by a group of Serbian students from Europe and North America in mid-July 1997. The organization was created with the intention of expanding it to become global, in the form of a network that connects all existing groups of students abroad, along with establishing new ones where they did not already exist. In the months following OSSA's founding, the Organization managed to connect 10 clubs of Serbian students in the United States, Great Britain, France and Germany, creating the ‘official’ foundation of the organization. OSSA has since continued to grow, expanding its work to Asia and Australia, along with founding and solidifying branches across Europe and North America.

Founders 
The organization was founded by a group of 15 Serbian students in the United States and Western Europe. They strived for progress in the areas of diplomacy, academic work, entrepreneurship, international relations and politics.

 Jovan Ratković (OSSA president 1997–1998), Norwich, UK
 Aleksandar Jovović (OSSA president 1998–1999), Washington, USA
 Dejan Andjelković, Seattle, USA
 Ivana Vujić, New Jersey, USA
 Milan Zelčević, Toronto, Canada
 Helena Zdravković, Hartford, Connecticut, USA
 Vuk Jeremić, London, UK
 Aleksandar Kojić, Boston, USA
 Milan Milenković, Stuttgart, Germany
 Miloš Misajlović, London, UK
 Ana Mitrović, Boston, USA
 Milan Pavlović, New York, USA
 Mihailo Petrović, Paris, France
 Andrej Fajgelj, Paris, France
 Marko Škorić, London, UK

Mission 
Although OSSA undertakes a number of activities, the main objectives of OSSA are:

 assisting Serbian students who wish to study abroad
 assisting Serbian students returning to Serbia after their graduation
 promoting Serbia abroad
 organizing internships for international students to gain work experience in Serbia
 promoting cooperation with other student organizations around the world
 Networking Serbian students studying abroad

According to OSSI's mission statement, its members conduct all activity while respecting the uniqueness of cultures, communities and universities in which they live, constantly incorporating knowledge gained into the development of OSSI and its local branches. OSSI aims to be the most extensive, competent and information wealthy network of Serbian students abroad.

Organisational structure

Board Members (2019-2021) 

 President: Aleksandar Ljubomirović
 Vice President - Anđela Janković
 Vice President - Sofija Matić
 Director of the Sector for Marketing and Public Relations - Dijana Avdić
 Director of the Sector for Local Branches - Nikola Smatlik
 Director of the Finance Sector - Ana Stambolić
 Director of the Legal Affairs Sector - Aleksandra Dubovac
 Director of the Department of Internal Affairs - Milena Nedeljković
 Chairman of the Supervisory Board - Aljoša Palija

International branches 
OSSA's international branches represent organizational units of students abroad. Though individual branches undertake various projects as well, their main task is to help network Serbian students in their respective countries, as well as provide assistance to any Serbian student wishing to study abroad.

OSSA currently has a total of 22 country-level branches, expanding across Europe, North America, Asia, and Australia.

Directors of OSSA's international branches:

 United States - Lena Babunski
 Canada - Stefan Petrović
 Great Britain - Đorđe Živanović
 Ireland - Mia Brzaković
 Spain - Njegoš Janković
 France - Jovan Nedeljković
 The Netherlands - Maša Samardzić
 Belgium - Aleksandar Todorović
 Germany - Dijana Avdić
 Switzerland - Jovana Mićić
 Italy - Katarina Djorovic 
 Austria(Vienna) - Sofija Bečanović
 Slovenia - Milena Nedeljković
 Denmark - Dino Nikolić
 Norway - Jelena Rončević
 Sweden - Nevena Šljivić & Jelena Mišić
 Czech Republic - Aco Lukić
 Greece - Sonia Porej
 Russia - Maša Bubalo
 China - Ognjen Draganić
 Australia - Nikola Ilievski
 Hungary - Teodor Tričković
 Hong Kong - Veljko Kovač

Projects

OSSIlation (Summer and Winter) 
OSSIlation (Summer and Winter) (Serbian: OSSIlacija) or the annual assembly of OSSA is the most important project of the Organization, which is held twice a year. Through this event, OSSA members from across the globe help determine the future of the organization, make proposals, and conduct elections for various positions within the organization. The second part of the event consists of a formal gala attended by the numerous partners of the organization, including representatives from public institutions, universities, the diplomatic corps, and various private businesses, which opens the opportunity for students to network both privately and professionally.

pOSSIbility 
POSSIbility was created with the aim of helping Serbian students studying abroad find internships and working opportunities in Serbia, both in the public and private sector. Additionally, "Possibility" aims to help Serbs return to Serbia from the diaspora, as well as help them utilize their international skills and knowledge to improve the situation in their home country. This project also encourages youth participation, as it assists in giving talented and successful Serbian students the opportunity to influence the development of their country.

Summer Networking Event (SNE) 
Summer networking event (SNE) is one of the main annual events of OSSA. Serving as a more informal version of OSSIlation, this event serves as an opportunity for OSSA members to meet each other as well as Serbian students studying in Serbia, whether they are interested in going abroad or simply want to network with their peers who are studying in another country. The event is attended by OSSA partners from both the public and private sectors (such as representatives from various ministries, universities, domestic and foreign private companies...), allowing Serbian students to expand their professional networks as well.

Youth on the Move 
The project "Youth on the Move" (Serbian: Mladi u pokretu) seeks to raise awareness amongst and inform young people in the final years of high school and university education, but also young people from vulnerable social groups, about academic mobility programs and the benefits of using these programs. Through activities done at both a local and national level, the project contributes to raising awareness and the capacity of young people to participate in academic mobility programs by connecting them with relevant institutions.

References

Student organizations established in 1997
1997 establishments in Serbia
Ethnic student organizations